Tverrseten Col is an ice col between Setenuten Peak and Petrellfjellet in the Muhlig-Hofmann Mountains, Queen Maud Land. Mapped by Norwegian cartographers from surveys and air photos by the Norwegian Antarctic Expedition (1956–60) and named Tverrseten (the transverse seat).

Mountain passes of Queen Maud Land
Princess Martha Coast